Conax develops television encryption, conditional access and content security for digital television. Conax provide CAS technology to pay TV operators in 85 countries. The company has offices in Norway (headquarters), Russia, Germany, Brazil, the United States, Canada, Mexico, Indonesia, Philippines, Thailand, China, Singapore, and India, with a 24/7 Global Support Center in India.

Conax stems from Telenor Research Labs in the 1980s. It was incorporated as a separate company Conax AS in 1994.

In March 2014, the company was sold by Telenor Group to Swiss-based Kudelski Group for NOK 1.5 billion.

Conax CAS employs several versions, namely Conax CAS 3, Conax CAS 5, Conax CAS 7, Conax CAS 7.5 and Conax Contego. Those versions are shared amongst two types of CAM: Chipset Pairing and Generic/Non-Chipset Pairing in which compatible TV Smart Cards may not support one or the other. The company also provide DRM-solution for streaming services based on Microsoft PlayReady and Google Widevine.

A few pay TV operators using Conax conditional access are (alphabetic ordre) : 
4TV Myanmar
AKTA Telecom Romania
Allente (Norway) (previously Viasat/Canal Digital Satellite) 
AntikSAT (Slovakia)
Cignal Philippines
Cyfrowy Polsat, Platforma Canal+ and Orange Polska (Poland)
DigitAlb (Albania)
Digicable India 
Dish TV (India)
DMAX - germany
Focus Sat (operated by UPC Romania, later M7 Group)
HOMESAT (Lebanon)
Joyne Netherlands
JSTV (Europe)
K-Vision (Indonesia)
Malivision (Mali)
Mindig TV Hungary
RiksTV (Norway)
SBB (Serbia)
SitiCable India
StarTimes Media (SSA)
Telenor (Norway and Sweden)
TeleRed (Argentina)
TVR Romania

Conax is also used by MNC Media's free to air channels (RCTI, MNCTV and GTV. also iNews was encrypted during sport programme.) and K-Vision to encrypt some programs for satellite transmissions for prevent illegal redistribution by unlicensed local cable operators or others third parties and encrypt all copyrighted content on MNC media Transponder at Telkom-4.

References

External links
 

Conditional-access television broadcasting
Digital rights management
Broadcast engineering
Digital television
Norwegian companies established in 1994